Crucero District is one of ten districts of the province Carabaya in Peru.

Geography 
Other mountains are listed below:

Ethnic groups 
The people in the district are mainly indigenous citizens of Quechua descent. Quechua is the language which the majority of the population (75.80%) learnt to speak in childhood, 23.89% of the residents started speaking using the Spanish language (2007 Peru Census).

See also 
 Ariquma Lake
 Wiluyuq Qucha

References